Apolo is a location in the Franz Tamayo Province in the La Paz Department, Bolivia, South America, with a population of 2,123 in the year 2001. It is the seat of the Apolo Municipality.

The main plaza is dominated by a large Roman Catholic Chapel. There are three schools with most children attending in the morning.

It is approximately fourteen hours away from the La Paz capital. On the way to Apolo the road is accompanied by numerous waterfalls and changing landscapes.

The village is served by Apolo Airport.

References

 www.ine.gov.bo

Populated places in La Paz Department (Bolivia)
Populated places established in 1587
Populated places established in 1615
Populated places established in 1690
1587 establishments in the Spanish Empire